Brad Dexter (born March 29, 1972) is a Canadian retired professional ice hockey defenceman who has served as an assistant coach with the Colgate Raiders of the ECAC Hockey conference in the NCAA since 2005.

Dexter was a four-year letterwinner in hockey at Colgate. He was named to the All-America second team and all-ECAC Hockey first team as a senior in 1996. As a junior, he earned second-team all-ECAC honors and was named to the league's all-rookie team his first season.

As a senior at Colgate, Dexter registered 32 points, which is tied for seventh on the school¹s single-season scoring by defensemen list. He was named to the All-America second team and all-ECAC first team in 1996. He earned second-team all-ECAC honors as a junior, and was named to the league¹s all-rookie team his first season.

Dexter is tied for 70th on Colgate's all-time career scoring list with 20 goals and 65 assists for 85 points in 108 games. Among Raider defensemen, Dexter ranks sixth all-time in assists, eighth in points, and is tied for 10th in goals.

Career statistics

Awards and honours

References

External links

Colgate University Athletics Website, Brad Dexter's Profile

1972 births
Herning Blue Fox players
Canadian ice hockey defencemen
Colgate Raiders men's ice hockey players
Kansas City Blades players
Living people
Pensacola Ice Pilots players
Raleigh IceCaps players
South Carolina Stingrays players
Syracuse Crunch players
Victoria Salmon Kings players
Ice hockey people from Ontario
Sportspeople from Brockville
Canadian expatriate ice hockey players in Denmark
AHCA Division I men's ice hockey All-Americans